The Princeton Cooperative is a housing cooperative located on Capitol Hill, Seattle, Washington. It was built as the Ansonia apartment house in 1906 and was incorporated as a co-op in 1948. The building has 25 member-owned units and one unit owned by the corporation that is an amenity rental. There are three floors with eight units per floor. One unit is located in the basement as is communal storage and laundry facilities. The co-op is equipped with Wave G fiber internet service.

Owner
The building is owned by a non-profit corporation of which the residents of the building are member owners. The co-op is run cooperatively by the members via the Board of Directors that meets monthly to manage the co-op's business.

Membership
Any individual may become a member of the co-op after approval by a majority of the Board after being interviewed and submitted to a background check. The Board of Directors considers whether individuals are qualified and have a comparable community interest with current members of the co-op.

Cleaning duties and basic maintenance are performed by volunteers and service providers.

Gallery

References

External links

 

Housing cooperatives in the United States